The 2021 Antalya Challenger was a professional tennis tournament played on clay courts. It was the first edition of the tournament which was part of the 2021 ATP Challenger Tour. It took place in Antalya, Turkey between 25 and 31 January 2021.

Singles main-draw entrants

Seeds

1 Rankings as of 18 January 2021.

Other entrants
The following players received wildcards into the singles main draw:
  Marsel İlhan
  Cem İlkel
  Ergi Kırkın

The following players received entry from the qualifying draw:
  Duje Ajduković
  Roberto Cid Subervi
  Blaž Kavčič
  Akira Santillan

The following player received entry as a lucky loser:
  Tomás Martín Etcheverry

Champions

Singles

 Jaume Munar def.  Lorenzo Musetti 6–7(7–9), 6–2, 6–2.

Doubles

 Denys Molchanov /  Aleksandr Nedovyesov def.  Luis David Martínez /  David Vega Hernández 3–6, 6–4, [18–16].

References

2021 ATP Challenger Tour
2021 in Turkish tennis
January 2021 sports events in Turkey
Antalya Open